The Other Woman may refer to:

 Mistress (lover), a woman in an intimate relationship with a man who is married to a different woman

Film and television 
 The Other Woman (1918 film), an American silent drama film
 The Other Woman (1921 film), an American silent drama film
 The Other Woman (1924 film), a German silent drama film
 The Other Woman (1931 film), a British drama film
 The Other Woman (1954 film), an American film noir by Hugo Haas
 The Other Woman, a 1959 Hong Kong film directed by Griffin Yueh Feng
 The Other Woman, an alternate title for As a Wife, As a Woman, a 1961 Japanese film by Mikio Naruse
 "The Other Woman", a 1973 episode of the television anthology series ABC's Matinee Today
 The Other Woman (1978 film), an Egyptian drama film
 The Other Woman (1983 film), a made-for-television film written by and starring Anne Meara 
 The Other Woman (1995 film), a made-for-television film
 The Other Woman (2006 film), or The Unknown Woman, 2006 Italian film
 "The Other Woman" (Lost), a 2008 episode of the television show Lost
 The Other Woman (2009 film), a 2009 American film starring Natalie Portman
 "The Other Woman" (Mad Men), a 2012 episode of the television show Mad Men
 The Other Woman (2014 film), a 2014 American comedy film directed by Nick Cassavetes
 The Other Woman, an episode from TV series Feud

Literature 
 The Other Woman (Ryan novel), a 2012 novel by Hank Phillippi Ryan
 The Other Woman (Silva novel), 2018
 The Other Woman, a 1983 novel by Joy Fielding, and a 2008 TV film adaptation
 The Other Woman, a 2003 novel by Eric Jerome Dickey

Music 
 "The Other Woman", a 1959 song written by Jessie Mae Robinson
 The Other Woman, a 1965 album by Ray Price, or the song "The Other Woman (In My Life)" 
 The Other Woman (Ray Parker, Jr. album), 1982
 "The Other Woman" (Ray Parker Jr. song), 1982
 "The Other Woman" (Loretta Lynn song), 1963
 The Other Woman, a 1994 album by Michael Dunford of Renaissance
 The Other Woman (Miss Jones album), 1998
 The Other Woman (Deni Hines and James Morrison album), 2007
 The Other Woman covered by Lana Del Rey on Ultraviolence

See also
 Other Women (disambiguation)